Lalitpur District is one of the districts of Uttar Pradesh state of India. Lalitpur district is a part of Jhansi Division. Lalitpur is the main town and administrative headquarters. The district occupies an area of 5,039 km².

Lalitpur District is a part of Jhansi Division and was carved out as a district in the year 1974. It is connected to Jhansi District by a narrow corridor to the northeast, and is otherwise almost surrounded by Madhya Pradesh state, an example of a salient.

Lalitpur district lies between latitude 24°11' and 25°14' (north) and longitude 78°10' and 79°0' (east) and is bounded by district Jhansi in the north, districts Sagar and Tikamgarh of Madhya Pradesh state in the east and Ashoknagar district of Madhya Pradesh separated by river Betwa in the west. The district had a population of 1,221,592 as per the census of year 2011.

This district has a number of historical and cultural places like Deogarh, Seeronji, Pavagiri, Devamata, Neelkantheshwar at Pali, Chawan near Bant(Pali).Machkund ki Gufa. Lalitpur town has variety of places like many Hindu & Jain temples. Raghunathji (Bada Mandir)(Kali Bauaa ji Mandir), Shivalay, Boodhe Babba (Hanumanji), Tuvan Mandir for Hindus & Bada Mandir, Ata Mandir & Kshetrapalji for Jains are famous temples.

Geography
The district forms a portion of the hill country of Bundelkhand, sloping down from the outliers of the Vindhya Range on the south to the tributaries of the Yamuna River on the north. The extreme south is composed of parallel rows of long and narrow-ridged hills. Through the intervening valleys the rivers flow down over ledges of granite or quartz. North of the hilly region, the granite chains gradually turn into clusters of smaller hills.Lalitpur itself holds an important place in the field of minerals. There is availability of granite, maurum, pyrophyllite, sandstone, sand stone besides many other minerals. Above all, after rock-phosphate, the evidence of the presence of iron ore, gold and platinum deposits has been found here.
The Betwa River forms the northern and western boundary of the district, and most of the district lies within its watershed. The Jamni River, a tributary of the Betwa, forms the eastern boundary. The Dhasan River forms the district's southeastern boundary, and the southeastern portion of the district lies within its watershed.

The district is now facing a secessionist movement originated in southern Uttar Pradesh and northern Madhya Pradesh to create a separate state of Bundelkhand, as this area is traditionally called by locals.

Climate
The climate of the district is sub-tropical, which is characterised by a very hot dry summer and a cold winter. Similar to other districts of the Bundelkhand region, this district also has four distinct seasons in a year. The summer season is from March to mid-June, the southwest monsoon is from mid-June to September. Post-monsoonal transition between October and November months constitute the post-monsoon season and the winter season lasts from December to February.

History

The territory of the present-day Lalitpur district was part of the state of Chanderi, founded in the 17th century by a Bundela Rajput who was descended from Rudra Pratap Singh of Orchha. Chanderi, along with most of Bundelkhand, came under Maratha hegemony in the 18th century. Daulat Rao Sindhia of neighboring Gwalior annexed Chanderi state in 1812. 
In 1844, the former state of Chanderi was ceded to the British, and became the Chanderi District of British India, with Lalitpur town as the district headquarters. The British lost the district in the Indian Rebellion of 1857, and it was not reconquered until late 1858. In 1861, the portion of the district west of the Betwa, including Chanderi, was returned to Gwalior state, and the remainder was renamed Lalitpur district. It became a part of Jhansi district from 1891 to 1974. In 1974, the district was carved out from Jhansi district.

Economy
In 2006 the Ministry of Panchayati Raj named Lalitpur one of the country's 250 most backward districts (out of a total of 640). It is one of the 34 districts in Uttar Pradesh currently receiving funds from the Backward Regions Grant Fund Programme (BRGF).

Divisions
Lalitpur is divided into five tehsils, Lalitpur, Mehroni, Talbehat, Madawara and Pali; four towns, Lalitpur, Mehroni, Talbehat, and Pali; and 754 villages. The district magistrate is Mr. Yogendra shukla, IAS and the Superintendent of police is Mr. Mirza manzar beg,IPS, and the District Information Officer is Murlidhar Singh.

There are two Uttar Pradesh Vidhan Sabha constituencies in this district: Lalitpur and Mehroni. Both of these are part of Jhansi Lok Sabha constituency. At present, Ram Ratan Kushwaha is the MLA from Lalitpur constituency and Mannu Kori is the MLA from Mehroni constituency.
At present chairman of Nagar Palika Parishad Lalitpur is Mrs. Rajni Sahu and chairman of Talbehat Nagar Panchayat is Mrs. Mukta Soni.

Demographics

According to the 2011 census Lalitpur district, Uttar Pradesh has a population of 1,221,592, roughly equal to the nation of Bahrain or the US state of New Hampshire. This gives it a ranking of 391st in India (out of a total of 640). 
Its population growth rate over the decade 2001-2011 was  24.57%. Lalitpur has a sex ratio of 905 females for every 1000 males, and a literacy rate of 64.95%. Scheduled Castes and Scheduled Tribes made up 19.69% and 5.86% of the population respectively. The tribals in the district are the Saharias.

At the time of the 2011 Census of India, 81.60% of the population in the district spoke Hindi and 17.51% Bundeli as their first language.

Transport
The city is well connected by railways and road transport.

Railways
Lalitpur Junction railway station falls under main railway line of India.  It is well connected by train services to all parts of the country. Daily trains are available to Mumbai, Delhi, Kolkata (Howrah), Chen nai, Agra, Jammu Tawi, Bangalore (Bengaluru), Trivendrum, Indore, Ahmedabad, Pune, Jammu, Lucknow, Bhopal, Jabalpur, Kanpur and other major towns.
Lalitpur station is a junction now, with trains directly to Khajuraho, Singrauli, Satna & Tikamgarh.

Road transport
India's biggest national highway from Kashmir to Kanyakumari NH-44 passes through Lalitpur, connecting major cities of India.
Bus facility to major cities - Kanpur, Indore, Bhopal, Sagar, Panna.

Note: Lalitpur district in UP is also known for Uranium deposits.

See also
 Lalitpur Thermal Power Station

References

External links
Lalitpur district website

 
Districts of Uttar Pradesh
1974 establishments in Uttar Pradesh